The fourth and final season of Unforgettable an American police procedural drama television series originally aired on A&E from November 27, 2015, through January 22, 2016.

Cast and characters

Main
 Poppy Montgomery as Det. Carrie Wells
 Dylan Walsh as Lt. Al Burns
 James Hiroyuki Liao as Det. Jay Lee
 E. J. Bonilla as Det. Denny Padilla
 Alani Anthony as Dr. Delina Michaels
 Kathy Najimy as Capt. Sandra Russo

Recurring
 Dallas Roberts as Eliot Delson
 Skeet Ulrich as Det. Eddie Martin

Episodes

Production

Development
After being cancelled following three seasons by CBS, Unforgettable was picked up by A&E for a fourth season. Unforgettable was canceled after its fourth season on February 16, 2016.

Casting
In May 2015, it was announced that E.J. Bonilla, Alani Anthony, and Kathy Najimy joined as series regulars as Det. Denny Padilla, Dr. Delina Michaels, and Capt. Sandra Russo.

Broadcast
Season four of Unforgettable premiered on November 27, 2015.

Reception

Ratings

References

External links
 

2015 American television seasons
2016 American television seasons
4